Cressona is a genus of shield bugs in the subfamily Phyllocephalinae, erected by William Sweetland Dallas in 1851.

Species
The following are included in BioLib.cz:
 Cressona divaricata L.Y. Zheng & Zou, 1982
 Cressona rufa Zhang & Lin, 1984
 Cressona valida Dallas, 1851 - type species, Myanmar

References

External links
 

Pentatomidae
Hemiptera genera
Hemiptera of Asia